Oleśno  is a village in the administrative district of Gmina Gronowo Elbląskie, within Elbląg County, Warmian-Masurian Voivodeship, in northern Poland.

The village has a population of 200.

References

Villages in Elbląg County